The Lobau is a Vienna floodplain on the northern side of the Danube in Donaustadt and partly in Großenzersdorf, Lower Austria. It has been part of the Danube-Auen National Park since 1996 and has been a protected area since 1978. It is used as a recreational area and is known as a site of nudism. There is also an oil harbour, and the Austrian Army used the Lobau as a training ground. In addition to the water coming from the Alps through the Wiener Hochquellenwasserleitung, the Lobau is a source of groundwater for Vienna.

The Donauinsel (Vienna Danube Island) borders the Lobau.

History
The Lobau was the site of the Battle of Aspern-Essling in 1809, the first major defeat suffered by Napoléon, which was inflicted on him by an Austrian army led by Archduke Charles, and of the Battle of Wagram, a victory for Napoleon that followed two months later.

During the Oil Campaign of World War II, the Lobau oil refinery was bombed beginning on August 22, 1944.

Impact on the environment 
Some small territories were used by the army for soldier training. The Lobau also has a big impact on tapwater in Vienna itself, since it is one of the sources to provide water to its population.

The Lobau houses a huge amount of different species of the flora and fauna that are in danger of extinction.

Since 1977 the Lobau with a  property is considered as a biosphere reserve by UNESCO.

The Lobau is composed of nature zones, of which only 25% are being taken care of.

Since 1978 the Lobau is at the same time an area under landscape protection, a preserved area and also a biosphere reserve. The area covers one fifth of the 22nd district in Vienna.

Flora and fauna 
The Lobau consists in a flora and fauna of exception, but on its way to extinction due to environmental problems. This is why, to preserve it, the Lobau has become a protected area since 1996. Furthermore, starting October 26, 1996 the protected park has integrated the national park of Donau Auen, which is one of natural areas "nature 2000". The area has been designated as a protected Ramsar site since 1982.

Reed bed 
The Josefsteg is a bridge found in the middle of the Lobau. 150 years ago there was a river bed, it was the Danube's bed. As said before this park is known for its wide variety of flora and fauna and one typical example is the reed bed surrounding the Josefsteg covering a large part of the area. The common reed, (Phragmites australis), is a cosmopolite species of perennial plant that belongs to the Poaceae, which is a sub family of the Arundinoideae.

References

External links

Donaustadt
Biosphere reserves of Austria
Landforms of Vienna
Oil campaign of World War II
Floodplains of Europe
Ramsar sites in Austria
Nude beaches